Camille D'Arcy (1879 – September 26, 1916) was a stage and silent film actress in the early years of the movie business up to 1916, a relatively large woman she played matron or character roles in silent films. During her short movie career all of her film appearances were with the Essanay Company out of Chicago. In private life she was married to Dr. Loren Wilder. In the fall of 1916 she went swimming in Lake Michigan, caught an infection and died at age 37 in Chicago.

Filmography
Third Hand High (1915)*short
The Strength of the Weak (1915)*short
The Fable of the Galumptious Girl (1915)*short
The Snow-Burner (1915)*short
The White Sister (1915)
 (1915)*short
 (1915)*short
 (1915)*short
The Circular Path (1915)*short
The Reaping (1915)*short
The Fable of the Escape of Arthur and the Salvation of Herbert (1915)*short
The Fable of the Low Down Expert on the Subject of Babies (1915)*short
A Daughter of the City (1915)
Captain Jinks of the Horse Marines (1916)
Beyond the Law (1916)*short
Putting it Over (1916)*short
The Grouch (1916)*short
The Prince Chap (1916)
The Pacifist (1916)*short

References

External links
 

1870s births
1916 deaths
American silent film actresses
20th-century American actresses